The Runaways is the debut studio album by American rock band the Runaways. It was released on June 1, 1976, by Mercury Records.

AllMusic has praised the album (especially band members Cherie Currie, Joan Jett and Lita Ford), comparing the band's music to material by Led Zeppelin and Aerosmith.

According to multiple sources, including Cherie Currie (in her memoir Neon Angel), the liner notes of the 2003 Cherry Red Records reissue of The Runaways, and Jackie Fox herself, bassist Nigel Harrison played bass on the album, due to manager Kim Fowley refusing to let Fox play on the record.

The documentary film Edgeplay: A Film About the Runaways states that the album's first track "Cherry Bomb" was written ad hoc during the audition of lead singer Cherie Currie and the title is a play on the pronunciation of Currie's first name. Currie was told to prepare a Suzi Quatro song for the audition; she picked "Fever", a song the band did not know how to play. Instead, Jett and Fowley came up with the song and had Currie sing it for her audition.

In January 2009, "Cherry Bomb" was ranked 52nd on VH1's 100 Greatest Hard Rock Songs list. A cover of "Cherry Bomb" is featured in the music video game Rock Band as a downloadable single track. The song also featured in the films Dazed and Confused, RV, Cherrybomb, The Runaways, and Guardians of the Galaxy, and is played in the opening scene of Margaret Cho's stand-up comedy DVD "I'm the One That I Want".

"You Drive Me Wild" is featured in the 2010 film about the band. Actress Dakota Fanning covers "Cherry Bomb" as well as "Dead End Justice" with Kristen Stewart, as they portray Cherie Currie and Joan Jett, respectively.

Track listing

Personnel
Credits adapted from the liner notes of The Runaways.

The Runaways
 The Runaways – arrangements
 Cherie Currie – lead vocals, piano
 Joan Jett – rhythm guitar, lead vocals
 Lita Ford – lead guitar
 Sandy West – drums, vocals
 Jackie Fox – bass, vocals (only credited, did not perform on the album)

Additional musicians
 Scott Anderson – arrangements
 Kim Fowley – arrangements
 Rodney Bingenheimer – orchestration
 Nigel Harrison – bass (uncredited)

Technical
 Kim Fowley – production, direction
 Andy Morris – sound
 Scott Anderson – production coordination
 Gilbert Kong – mastering
 Bill Jimmerson – recording
 Lawrence W. Wendelken – recording

Artwork
 Tom Gold – photography
 Desmond Strobel – design

Charts

References

1976 debut albums
Albums produced by Kim Fowley
Mercury Records albums
The Runaways albums